World Trade Center Barcelona is a business park located in Barcelona, opened on 22 July 1999. This business center is located on the waterfront close to the city center, and has  of rented office and a conference center, conventions and meeting spaces with 20 different rooms.

WTCB building structure was inspired by the shape of a boat surrounded by the Mediterranean Sea, and created by American architect Henry N. Cobb. The four towers house offices for rent, a congress center and the Hotel Grand Marina.

The flexibility of space is also a feature of the convention center, offering the possibility of organizing meetings of 8 to large events with up to 1,500 attendees.

External links 

WTC Barcelona
Access and car park

Buildings and structures in Barcelona
Business parks
Convention centers in Catalonia
Barcelona